Arain Abad is a village of Jhelum District in the Punjab Province of Pakistan.

It is located near the town of Pinanwal and is a part of Pind Dadan Khan Tehsil, and is located at 32°38'48"N 73°15'16"E with an altitude of 206 metres (679 feet).

References 

Populated places in Jhelum District